Got to Be Tough is the debut studio album by American rapper and producer MC Shy-D. It was released on August 12, 1987, via Luke Skyywalker Records. The album peaked at number 197 on the Billboard 200 and number 41 on the Top R&B Albums chart.

Track listing 

Sample credits
Track 1 contains elements from "Brazilian Rhyme (Beijo Interlude)" by Earth, Wind & Fire (1977)
Track 2 contains elements from "Ike's Mood I" by Isaac Hayes (1970) and "(Sittin' On) The Dock of the Bay" by Otis Redding (1968)
Track 3 contains elements from "Rock Steady" by Aretha Franklin (1971), "Pump Me Up" by Trouble Funk (1982) and "(Nothing Serious) Just Buggin' by Whistle (1986)
Track 4 contains elements from "I'll Be There" by The Jackson 5 (1970), "Christmas Rappin by Kurtis Blow (1979) and "La Di Da Di" by Doug E. Fresh & Slick Rick (1985)
Track 5 contains elements from "Brazilian Rhyme (Beijo Interlude)" by Earth, Wind & Fire (1977) and "Catch a Groove" by Juice (1976)
Track 6 contains elements from "I Can't Live Without My Radio" by LL Cool J (1985) and "Change the Beat (Female Version)" by Beside (1982)
Track 8 contains elements from "Celebrate the Good Things" by Pleasure (1978)
Track 9 contains elements from "I Don't Wanna Lose Your Love" by The Emotions (1976), "Set It Off" by Strafe (1984) and "Dance to the Drummer's Beat" by Herman Kelly & Life (1978)
Track 10 contains elements from "Got to Be Real" by Cheryl Lynn (1978), "It's a Shame" by The Spinners (1970) and "Good Times" by Chic (1979)
Track 12 contains elements from "Good Times" by Chic (1979), "Bang Zoom (Let's Go-Go)" by The Real Roxanne & Howie Tee (1986) and "Tough" by Kurtis Blow (1982)

Personnel 
 Peter T. Jones – main artist, vocals, scratches, producer, mixing, arranging
 DJ Man – scratches, co-producer
 Rodney Cedric Terry – design, mixing, co-producer
 Luther Campbell – executive producer
 Norm Titcomb – mixing, recording
 Michael Fuller – mastering
 Rose Campbell – artwork
 Ed Robinson – photography

Charts

References

External links 
 

1987 debut albums
MC Shy D albums
Luke Records albums